Erez Safar is an American DJ, producer and songwriter who records under the names Diwon and h2the. He is CEO of Bancs Media, an American production company specializing in music and video production; Studio Bancs, a creative art space; and Shemspeed, a record label and promotional agency. He is the founder and director of the Sephardic Music Festival, and Gallery 38 in Los Angeles.

Early life and education
Safar, an Orthodox Jew, is the son of an American Jewish father and Yemenite Jewish mother. He grew up listening to Mizrahi and Yemenite music. In 2003, he graduated from the University of Maryland, and moved to Brooklyn later that year.

Career

Early career
Safar's career in music began at the University of Maryland when he founded Juez, a breakbeat klezmer jazz quartet in which he played drums. That year, he also began performing under the moniker DJ Handler, spinning a blend of hip hop, afrobeat, and Arabic music. In 2004, Juez released their lone album, Shemspeed Alt Schule, on Modular Moods, an independent record label founded by Safar.

In 2007, Safar was named to The Forward 50, an annual list of the world's most influential Jews, as chosen by the editors of The Forward. He was recognized for his work as DJ Handler, for heading Modular Moods, for founding and running the Sephardic Music Festival, and for that year's formation of Shemspeed. That same year, in a cover story on DJ Handler, The Jerusalem Post called him "one of the top visionaries of young Jewish cool's celebrated vanguard."

Sephardic Music Festival
In an effort to introduce Sephardic music to a greater audience, Safar launched the Sephardic Music Festival in 2005. The seven-day festival takes place annually in December around Hanukkah at venues across New York City. The New York Times described the festival as having an "eclectic lineup of traditional and contemporary artists, including many dedicated to fusing disparate sounds or bridging new and old." Shemspeed has released two compilation albums, Sephardic Music Festival, Vol. 1 (2010) and Sephardic Music Festival, Vol. 2 (2012), featuring Middle Eastern-tinged tracks from a variety of acclaimed Jewish artists, including Matisyahu, Pharaoh's Daughter, DeScribe, Moshav and Sarah Aroeste.

Dreams In Static, Bonhom, h2the and solo work
In 2008, Safar changed his stage-name from DJ Handler to Diwon, a name inspired by the Yemenite book. (The diwan has meaning as a book of songs in Persian and Urdu.) "DJ Handler I started before I became a DJ, and I never felt like it was me — it never really fit," Safar said of the switch. "Making Yemenite music under the name 'Handler' sounded kind of absurd... and not in a good way." Diwon's music combines traditional Yemeni elements with modern electro hip-hop.

In 2009, Diwon worked with New York-based guitarist Dugans to form Dreams In Static, which released an instrumental LP, Serene Poetic, on February 2, 2010. The Forward wrote that the album "occupies an otherworldly, post-rock, electro-instrumental universe." In 2014, after expanding to include vocalist Akie Bermiss, Dreams In Static released the single "You're On Your Own". Diwon produced the music video. The band plans to release a new album later in 2014.

DJBooth.net has called Diwon a "buzzmaking beatsmith" in reference to his collaboration with Kyle Rapps, the mixtape Tyrone Gosling, inspired by the 2011 Ryan Gosling film Drive. In 2013, Diwon released his debut album, New Game, along with the album's first single, "Games That We Play" featuring Jesse Scott and Barney Bones. Also that year, his Bancs Media released the compilation Endless Summer, with tracks from artists including RZA, Kosha Dillz, Kool G Rap and others. On August 20, 2014, he released the instrumental album Pre-Game.

Diwon and James Coleman make up the pop group Bonhom. They released the single "Live for Now" in 2013.

In 2017, Diwon started making '80s-style synth music under the name h2the. The h2the album Beat Tape was released in 2017 on cassette tape. On May 21, 2020, h2the's Lo-Fi Live-Stream Album Release Party featured indie artists and painters in virtual rooms. On May 22, 2020, h2the released An Album of Lo-Fi Songs That Will Never Trend.

Israeli keffiyeh
In January 2010, Diwon began selling a keffiyeh through Shemspeed that he coined the "Israeli keffiyeh". It featured "blue embroidered Stars of David" and the slogan "Am Israeli Chai" ("The Nation of Israel Lives") sewn into it. The design caused a small amount of controversy, because it was seen as "inappropriate for Jews to use it as a pro-Israel symbol", but Diwon explained that since there are multiple kinds of keffiyeh that are used for a number of different political symbols, he wanted it to be "just one more interpretation of a scarf worn by our brothers for thousands of years".

Art gallery
Safar relocated to Los Angeles in 2012. He and Badir McCleary founded Gallery 38 in Los Angeles's West Adams neighborhood in 2015.

Discography

Albums
 Juez - Shemspeed Alt Schule (2004) (as Erez, playing drums)
 Benyamin Brody, Diwon & Dugans - Shir Hashirim (Song of Songs) (2009)
 Dreams In Static - Serene Poetic (2010)
 Diwon - New Game (2013)
 Diwon - Pre Game (2014)
 h2the - Beat Tape (2017)
 Dreams in Static - Part of the Machine (2017)
 h2the - An Album of Lo-Fi Songs That Will Never Trend (2020)

Singles
 Diwon featuring Y-Love & Sarah Aroeste - "Gonna Light" (2012)
 Bonhom - "Live for Now" (2013)
 Diwon featuring Jesse Scott and Barney Bones - "Games That We Play" (2013)
 Dreams In Static - "You're On Your Own" (2014)
 h2the - "Ready Player" (2018)
 Sirken & h2the - Howl" (2018)
 h2the & Flavia - "Gotta Let You Go" (2018)
 h2the - "High on You" (feat. Melinda Ortner) (2018)
 h2the & Slvmber - "Ignite Wonderland" (2018)
 Diwon - "Rock Like Me" (feat. Doodlebug, Y-Love & D. Black) (2018)
 Kit Major & h2the - "Bored, Broke & Beautiful" (2019)
 Saycyl & h2the - "Too Deep" (2019)
 h2the & Slvmber - "Need Your Love" (2019)
 h2the - "Matched" (2019)
 Diwon - "#TBT 2010" (2020)

Compilations
 Endless Summer (2013)

Mixtapes
 Rarities & Remixes
 The Beat Guide to Yiddish
 Sabra Sessions Volume 1
 I Heart Mixtape
 Psychadeliciwon
 Chulo
 Syndication (with Kyle Rapps)
 Tyrone Gosling (with Kyle Rapps)
 Honey Dijon (with Kyle Rapps & Y-Love)

As producer
 Y-Love - This Is Babylon (2008) (executive producer)
 Y-Love & Yuri Lane - Count It (Sefira) (2009)
 DeScribe & Y-Love - The Change EP (2009)
 Shemspeed MCs (DeScribe, Y-Love, Kosha Dillz & Eprhyme) vs. Electro Morocco - "Boom Selecta" (single) (2010)
 Y-Love - See Me - EP (2011)
 Lipa Schmeltzer & DeScribe - "Acharon Acharon, Chaviv (Diwon Remix)" (single) (2011)
 Y-Love & Tj Di Hitmaker featuring Andy Milonakis - "The Takeover" (single) (2011)
 Y-Love featuring Onili - "Focus on the Flair" (single) (2012)
 Mikey Pauker - Extraordinary Love (2013)
 Bonhom - Sex War (2015)
 Bonhom - Love Is Not the End (2018)
 Bonhom - Love Is War (2020)

References

External links
 Official website
 Bancs Media
 h2the website
 Gallery 38 website

Living people
Jewish American musicians
American Orthodox Jews
Shemspeed Records artists
American DJs
Record producers from New York (state)
Musicians from San Diego
University of Maryland, College Park alumni
Musicians from Brooklyn
Musicians from Los Angeles
Jewish hip hop record producers
American people of Yemeni-Jewish descent
Record producers from California
American chief executives
Year of birth missing (living people)
21st-century American Jews